Věříš si? (English: Do you believe in yourself?) is a Czech television game show for children from elementary schools (from 6th to 8th grade) and Czech junior high schools (from prima grade to tercie grade).

Rules
Every week four contestants compete in four challenges. At the beginning of the show, each contestant is given 100 starting points. Before most challenges each contestant is supposed to bet a certain number of points. If they reach the first place, they receive the bet number of points, if they reach the second place, they receive a half of the bet number of points. No points are received for the third place, and for the fourth place, the contestant loses all bet points. The winner of the show is the contestant with the highest number of received points.

Challenges

Warm-up
This challenge is called Zahřívačka in Czech. Its purpose for contestants is to gain some extra points for upcoming challenges. Each contestant is asked three trivia questions, and receives 10 points for every correctly answered one.

Triathlon
This challenge consists of three sub-challenges. Contestants are supposed to finish them as fast as possible, the fastest one reaches the first place.

Triathlon sub-challenges
Rowing: Contestants are supposed to row 200 meters using an indoor rower. 
Touch assignments: Contestants are supposed to do a certain assignment without using their eyesight. The assignments may vary in every episode, the most common ones are recognizing a letter, opening a chest with a key, and building a little Tower of Hanoi.
A puzzle: Contestants are supposed to solve a puzzle. The puzzle is usually a jigsaw, a tangram, or Towers of Hanoi.

Trivia
Contestants are supposed to answer nine trivia questions in three randomly chosen categories.

Virtual game
Since the show is sponsored by Sony, the contestants compete in various video games from Sony's EyeToy series.

Prizes
The winner of the show may either win a basic prize, or a special prize, depending on whether they succeed in a quick final assignment. The basic prize consists of various board games, card games, books, or little gadgets. The special prize may vary in every episode, usually it's a portable media player or a Sony video game console. The other three contestants who don't win the show are given Věříš si? T-shirts along with small gadgets or card games.

Guests
Exceptional children presenting their hobbies and/or activities (e.g. figure skating, horse riding etc.) are shown in a short clip within each show.

References
http://www.ceskatelevize.cz/verissi/

External links
 Official site (Czech)

Czech game shows
2007 Czech television series debuts
Czech children's television series
2000s Czech television series
Czech Television original programming